Elaine Elliott (born October 24, 1955) is a former head coach of the women's basketball team at the University of Utah. During a year-long leave of absence to consider retirement, former Assistant Coach Anthony Levrets took over as head coach. She is the winningest basketball coach in school history, having compiled a career record of 582–234 (.713). She has led the Utes to 15 appearances in NCAA Women's Division I Basketball Championship, including an Elite Eight appearance in 2006. The Utes came within 3 points of knocking out the eventual National Champions, the Maryland Terrapins. She has recorded nineteen 20-win seasons as well. She formally retired as head coach on March 23, 2011.

Starting with the 2011-12 season, Elaine Elliott was an assistant coach at Salt Lake City's Westminster College.

Elliott was born in Lakewood, Washington. She earned a master's degree from the University of Utah.

External links
Career profile

References

1955 births
Boise State Broncos women's basketball players
Utah Utes women's basketball coaches
Living people
People from Lakewood, Washington
Basketball players from Washington (state)
University of Utah alumni
American women's basketball players
American women's basketball coaches